Thailand competed at the 2000 Summer Olympics in Sydney, Australia.

Medalists

Results by event

Athletics

Men's 4 × 100 m
 Kongdech Netenee, Boonyarit Phuksachat, Visanu Sophanich, Sittichai Suwonprateep
 Round 1 – 39.13
 Semifinal – 39.05 (did not advance)

Men's 4 × 400 m
 Senee Kongtong, Jirachai Linglom, Narong Nilploy, Chalermpol Noohlong
 Round 1 – 03:11.65 (did not advance)

Women's 100m Hurdles
 Trecia Roberts
 Round 1 – 13.16
 Round 2 – 12.96
 Semifinal – 13.15 (did not advance)

Women's 4 × 100 m
 Supavadee Khawpeag, Orranut Klomdee, Trecia Roberts, Wirawan Ruamsuk
 Round 1 – 44.51 (did not advance)

Badminton

Men

Women

Mixed

Boxing

Diving

Men

Rowing

Sailing

Men's Mistral
 Arun Homraruen
 Race 1 – 27
 Race 2 – 26
 Race 3 – 13
 Race 4 – 25
 Race 5 – 29
 Race 6 – 26
 Race 7 – 19
 Race 8 – 16
 Race 9 – 23
 Race 10 – (30)
 Race 11 – (32)
 Final – 204 (29th place)

Women's Mistral
 Napalai Tansai
 Race 1 – 16
 Race 2 – 23
 Race 3 – (25)
 Race 4 – 21
 Race 5 – 16
 Race 6 – 15
 Race 7 – 14
 Race 8 – 17
 Race 9 – (25)
 Race 10 – 17
 Race 11 – 9
 Final – 148 (19th place)

Open Laser
 Veerasit Puangnak
 Race 1 – 37
 Race 2 – 36
 Race 3 – 28
 Race 4 – 20
 Race 5 – 23
 Race 6 – 38
 Race 7 – 3
 Race 8 – (40)
 Race 9 – 20
 Race 10 – (39)
 Race 11 – 33
 Final – 238 (31st place)

Shooting

Swimming

Men's 200m Freestyle
 Vicha Ratanachote
 Preliminary Heat – 1:54.91 (did not advance)

Men's 400m Freestyle
 Torwai Sethsothorn
 Preliminary Heat – 03:56.68 (did not advance)

Men's 1500m Freestyle
 Torwai Sethsothorn
 Preliminary Heat – 15:39.60 (did not advance)

Men's 200m Butterfly
 Dulyarit Phuangthong
 Preliminary Heat – 02:04.15 (did not advance)

Men's 200m Breaststroke
 Ratapong Sirisanont
 Preliminary Heat – 02:23.95 (did not advance)

Men's 100m Backstroke
 Dulyarit Phuangthong
 Preliminary Heat – 58.48 (did not advance)

Men's 200m Backstroke
 Torwai Sethsothorn
 Preliminary Heat – 02:05.52 (did not advance)

Men's 200m Individual Medley
 Pathunyu Yimsomruay
 Preliminary Heat – 02:08.38 (did not advance)

Men's 400m Individual Medley
 Torwai Sethsothorn
 Preliminary Heat – 04:28.42 (did not advance)

Women's 50m Freestyle
 Pilin Tachakittiranan
 Preliminary Heat – 27.31 (did not advance)

Women's 100m Freestyle
 Pilin Tachakittiranan
 Preliminary Heat – 58.69 (did not advance)

Women's 200m Freestyle
 Pilin Tachakittiranan
 Preliminary Heat – 02:05.88 (did not advance)

Women's 400m Freestyle
 Pilin Tachakittiranan
 Preliminary Heat – 04:29.28 (did not advance)

Women's 100m Butterfly
 Praphalsai Minpraphal
 Preliminary Heat – 01:02.99 (did not advance)

Women's 100m Backstroke
 Chonlathorn Vorathamrong
 Preliminary Heat – 01:05.98 (did not advance)

Women's 200m Backstroke
 Chonlathorn Vorathamrong
 Preliminary Heat – 02:21.59 (did not advance)

Table tennis

Tennis

Men

Women

Weightlifting

Men

Women

References

Wallechinsky, David (2004). The Complete Book of the Summer Olympics (Athens 2004 Edition). Toronto, Canada. .
International Olympic Committee (2001). The Results. Retrieved 12 November 2005.
Sydney Organising Committee for the Olympic Games (2001). Official Report of the XXVII Olympiad Volume 1: Preparing for the Games. Retrieved 20 November 2005.
Sydney Organising Committee for the Olympic Games (2001). Official Report of the XXVII Olympiad Volume 2: Celebrating the Games. Retrieved 20 November 2005.
Sydney Organising Committee for the Olympic Games (2001). The Results. Retrieved 20 November 2005.
International Olympic Committee Web Site
 sports-reference

Nations at the 2000 Summer Olympics
2000 Summer Olympics
Summer Olympics